Sandyakkenthinu Sindhooram is a 1984 Indian Malayalam film, directed by P. G. Vishwambharan and produced by Somaja Abraham. The film stars Dr.Balamuralikrishna, malayalam movie acted, Mammootty, Seema, Nedumudi Venu and Venu Nagavally in the lead roles. The film has musical score by Shyam.

Cast

Dr.Balamuralikrishna
Mammootty
Seema
Nedumudi Venu
Venu Nagavally
M. Balamuralikrishna
Krishnachandran
Santhosh
V. D. Rajappan
Baby Ambili
Balan K. Nair
Janardanan
Kunchan
Mala Aravindan
Poojappura Ravi
Soorya
T. G. Ravi

Soundtrack
The music was composed by Shyam and the lyrics were written by Kavalam Narayana Panicker.

References

External links
 

1984 films
1980s Malayalam-language films
Films directed by P. G. Viswambharan